This is a complete episode list for Frederator Studios' cartoon shorts incubator showcase Oh Yeah! Cartoons, on Nickelodeon.

Series overview

Episodes

Season 1 (1998)
Hosted by various school kids from Brooklyn.

Season 2 (1999)
Hosted by Kenan Thompson.

Season 3 (2002)
Hosted by Josh Server.

References

External links
 

Lists of American children's animated television series episodes
Lists of Nickelodeon television series episodes